Pantha  were a short lived Australian pop rock band formed in 1975. The group released one studio album which peaked at number 43 on the Australian charts in 1975.

Discography

Albums

Singles

References

Australian pop music groups
Musical groups established in 1975
Musical groups disestablished in 1976